The 2020 Utah State Aggies football team represented Utah State University in the 2020 NCAA Division I FBS football season. The Aggies played their home games at Maverik Stadium in Logan, Utah as members of the Mountain West Conference. Head coach Gary Andersen, who was in his second year back at Utah State (sixth overall), coached the first three games before he was fired after going 0–3. Co-defensive coordinator Frank Maile was named interim head coach. In a season limited due to the ongoing COVID-19 pandemic, the Aggies finished the conference-only season 1–5 to finish in 11th place in Mountain West play.

Following the season, the school announced Arkansas State head coach Blake Anderson would become the team's new head coach. 

The final scheduled game of the season was canceled due to a Utah State player boycott.

Previous season
The Aggies finished the 2019 season with a 7–6, 6–2 to finish in third place in the Mountain Division of the Mountain West. The team was invited to the Frisco Bowl where it lost to Kent State. The season marked Gary Andersen's first year back in charge of the Aggies after having coached the team from 2009 to 2012.

Personnel

Coaching staff
After an up-and-down year, various changes were made to the Aggie coaching staff. Offensive coordinator Mike Sanford left to take the same position at Minnesota, and was replaced by North Texas offensive coordinator Bodie Reeder. Defensive coordinator Justin Ena was reassigned as the inside linebackers coach. Frank Maile, assistant head coach and tight ends coach, was reassigned to defensive coordinator. He had previously been Utah State's defensive coordinator from 2016 to 2018. Stacy Collins, special teams and running backs coach, was named co-defensive coordinator with Maile. Bojay Filimoeatu was moved from defensive ends to outside linebackers. Dave Schramm, the offensive coordinator at Weber State, was hired as the new running backs coach. Safeties coach Mike Caputo was let go and is now at Baylor with former Utah State defensive coordinator Dave Aranda.

Source:

Player boycott of final game 
On December 11, a day before the scheduled final game of the season, it was reported that Blake Anderson would be named the team's new head coach. As a result of the announcement of the hire of Anderson and racially and religiously insensitive comments allegedly made by Utah State president Noelle Cockett, the Aggie players announced a boycott of the final game. The players had announced their support for the retention of interim head coach Maile, but were allegedly told by Cockett that Maile's religious and cultural background was a problem. Maile is of Polynesian descent and a Mormon. The players reported that it was not the first time issues of discrimination had occurred, citing a 2019 issue where the team's head equipment manager used a racial slur, but the manager ultimately continued his employment at the school.

Schedule
Utah State announced its 2020 football schedule on February 27, 2020. The 2020 schedule consisted of six home and six away games in the regular season. On August 10, 2020, the Mountain West Conference announced the suspension of the football season due to the COVID-19 pandemic.

On September 25, the Mountain West announced the 2020 season would return with a revised eight-game, conference-only season beginning October 24. On November 18, the scheduled November 19 game against Wyoming was canceled by the Mountain West Conference due to rising COVID–19 cases in the Utah State program. On December 11, the scheduled December 12 at Colorado State was canceled as a result of a Utah State player boycott in protest of comments made by their university president that they perceived as discriminatory.

Source

References

Utah State
Utah State Aggies football seasons
Utah State Aggies football